Francisco Gómez is a Spanish name which may refer to:

Academics
 Francisco Gómez Escobar, (1867–1938), writer and intellectual from Medellín, Colombia
 Frank Ray, born Francisco Gomez, American singer

Politicians
 Francisco Gómez de Sandoval, 1st Duke of Lerma (1552/1553–1625), favourite of Philip III of Spain
 Francisco Gomez (governor) (1576-1656), governor of New Mexico between 1641 and 1642
 Francisco Gómez de Quevedo y Santibáñez Villegas (1580–1645), Spanish nobleman, politician and writer of the Baroque era
 Francisco Esteban Gómez (1783–1853), Venezuelan military officer
 Francisco Gómez Palacio y Bravo (1824–1886), Mexican writer, educator, jurist and Liberal politician
 Francisco Gómez (acting president) (died 1854), acting President of Honduras, 1852 
 Francisco Gómez-Jordana, 1st Count of Jordana (1876–1944), Spanish soldier and politician
 Francisco Gómez (El Salvador President) (1796–1838), president of the state of El Salvador

Sportspeople
 Francisco Gómez (athlete) (born 1957), Cuban Olympic sprinter
 Francisco Gómez (footballer, born 1967), Mexican football manager and former defender
 Francisco Gomez (soccer, born 1979) (born 1979), retired American soccer player
 Francisco Gómez Kodela (born 1985), Argentine rugby union footballer
 Francisco Javier Gómez Noya (born 1983), Spanish triathlete
 Jesús Francisco Gómez (born 1992), Mexican-American professional boxer

Other uses
 Francisco Gómez, Chiapas, a municipality in the Mexican state of Chiapas

See also 
 Francisco Gomes (disambiguation)